The Huston Park Wilderness is located in south central Wyoming in the United States. Entirely within Medicine Bow National Forest, the wilderness was designated in 1984 to preserve the northernmost section of the central Rocky Mountains, an area of high mountain peaks and coniferous forest.

U.S. Wilderness Areas do not allow motorized or mechanized vehicles, including bicycles. Although camping and fishing are allowed with proper permit, no roads or buildings are constructed and there is also no logging or mining, in compliance with the 1964 Wilderness Act. Wilderness areas within National Forests and Bureau of Land Management areas also allow hunting in season.

See also
 List of U.S. Wilderness Areas

References

External links
 
 
 

Protected areas of Carbon County, Wyoming
Wilderness areas of Wyoming
Medicine Bow National Forest
Protected areas established in 1984
1984 establishments in Wyoming